Kevin Penix (May 5, 1962 – April 24, 2012) was an American state legislator in Arkansas. He served in the Arkansas House of Representatives in 2003. He lived in Fort Smith, Arkansas. He was a Republican. He represented Sebastian County. He was a Southern Baptist. He was born in Crossett, Arkansas.

References

Republican Party members of the Arkansas House of Representatives
People from Crossett, Arkansas
Politicians from Fort Smith, Arkansas
21st-century American politicians
1962 births
2012 deaths